Harold Percival Fear (16 April 1908 – 13 May 1943) played first-class cricket for Somerset in two matches in 1934. He was born at Finchley, Middlesex and died at Bishop's Hull, Taunton, Somerset.

Educated at Taunton School, Fear was a right-handed middle-order batsman. He made 23 in the second innings of his first match when Somerset were made to follow on by Sussex, and that was his highest first-class score. In his only other first-class appearance he made five against Lancashire in a high-scoring match.

References

1908 births
1943 deaths
English cricketers
Somerset cricketers
People educated at Taunton School
People from Finchley